As with other cities in Ireland, Limerick has a history of great architecture. A 1574 document prepared for the Spanish ambassador attests to its wealth and fine architecture:
Limerick is stronger and more beautiful than all the other cities of Ireland, well walled with stout walls of hewn marble... There is no entrance except by stone bridges, one of the two of which has 14 arches, and the other 8 ... for the most part the houses are of square stone of black marble and built in the form of towers and fortresses.
Many examples remain in the city to the present day – though much has been lost also, through wars, decay and modern development. Present-day Limerick has perhaps not as extensive historical architecture as other Irish cities, though some very notable examples remain, such as the 800-year-old St. Mary's Cathedral and King John's Castle.

Ecclesiastical architecture
St. Mary's Cathedral
St Mary's Cathedral is the older of Limerick's two cathedrals and dates from the 12th century. The cathedral has elements of both Romanesque and Gothic styles of architecture with Romanesque arches and doorways and Gothic windows. The plan and elevation of the cathedral show signs of the design being an altered over the years. The original plan of the church was in the form of a Latin cross. Additions were made to the cathedral during the episcopate of Stephen Wall, Bishop of Limerick. The Romanesque doorway on the west side is an impressive carving of chevrons and patterns. Like many medieval churches in Ireland, the building has been heavily restored by the Victorians. The cathedral plays a dominant role in this medieval area within Limerick City showing the amalgamation of the architectural styles of Romanesque and Gothic. The tower of St. Mary's Cathedral was added in the 14th century, and it rises to 120 feet

St. John's Cathedral

The main body of St. John's Cathedral was designed by English architect Philip Charles Hardwick, and constructed between 1856 and 1861. It has the tallest spire in Ireland at 94m (a later addition, designed by M.A. Hennessy and completed in 1883). The exterior of St. John's was completely refurbished in 2004, with new roofing and repointing of all stonework. The cathedral today cuts an imposing presence on an otherwise undeveloped side of the city centre. An important historical Protestant church sits near the cathedral also, and although in need of some repair, is now in use today by Dance Limerick.

St. Munchin's Church, Englishtown
The church was constructed by architect James Pain in 1837 replacing an earlier structure. The church is Gothic in design.

St. John's Church, Irishtown
Constructed in 1851 by architect Joseph Welland the church replaced an earlier dating from the 11th century.  This important historic site is adjacent to the former John's Gate and the town walls where the existing Citadel is located and incorporated within St. John's Hospital. The church has Romanesque features.

Franciscan Church, Henry Street
Designed by William Corbett, the church is a fine example of classical architecture with an imposing portico in a similar fashion to the GPO in O'Connell Street, Dublin and the Bank of Ireland in College Green. The church dates from 1826.

Sacred Heart Church, The Crescent
Designed by William Corbett, the church dates from 1832. Built in the classical style the facade is a centrepiece to The Crescent area of Georgian Limerick. The very fine classical interior, with a wealth of quality materials and craftsmanship, adds to the overall architectural importance of this ecclesiastical site.

St Saviour's Church (Dominicans)
The existing church in Glentworth Street was built in 1815, under the leadership of Fr Joseph Harrigan on land donated by Edward Henry, the Earl of Limerick. It replaced a church on Fish Lane. In 1973 it was elevated to a parish church. It as renjuvated in the 1860s by the architect John Wallace. The priory was built in 1943.

Medieval Limerick

The medieval city of Limerick is largely concentrated on the southern section of Kings Island known as Englishtown and south of the Abbey river in an area known as Irishtown, just to the north of the present day city center. The island contains some of Limerick's main attractions including King John's Castle which was completed in around 1200. The walls, towers and fortifications remain today. The remains of a Viking settlement was also uncovered during the construction of the visitor centre at the site. St. Mary's Cathedral was founded in 1168 and is recorded as the oldest building in Limerick. It was built on an earlier castle belonging to the King of Munster. Nicholas street and Mary Street the medieval center of Limerick contained many examples of medieval buildings including tall gabled houses in the Flemish or Dutch fashion. Unfortunately, very little, if any of this streetscape remains today. Following the development of Newtown Pery this area of the city went into decline. Today both the Englishtown and Irishtown areas remain neglected and dilapidated in appearance.

Castle Lane beside King Johns Castle includes a reconstruction of some medieval buildings including a granary, labourers cottage, and gabled houses. The development is mainly for tourism purposes.

Georgian architecture

Much Georgian architecture was evident in the city from about the 1800s onwards. Although some has since been demolished, much of the city centre area is built in the Georgian fashion. John's Square, in front of St. John's Cathedral, towards the city centre, is an example of this. Stone-faced Georgian offices and townhouses were built in a planned fashion around this square.  The development of Georgian Limerick was driven by Edmund Sexton Pery, speaker of the Irish House of Commons, and his name has been retained in the Georgian city centre; Newtown Pery. This development extended the city south of the Abbey river and the ancient medieval city. During this time most of the walls of the medieval city were torn down to facilitate the expansion of the city. The new city, Newtown Pery was built completely in Georgian style with long wide and elegant streets in grid plan design with O'Connell Street (previously Georges street) as its centre. The new Georgian town became the new economic and cultural centre of Limerick as the medieval city along with its main street, Nicholas street, fell largely into decline. Much of the Georgian architecture is still largely intact with the Crescent area of O' Connell street and Pery Square being among some of the finest examples of Georgian architecture in Ireland. One publicly accessible example of exquisite Georgian architecture is the People's Museum of Limerick at Pery Square. However much of the area is now in a neglected or decaying state while much of the more ornate styles around the retail areas of O' Connell street, William street and Sarsfield street has sadly been lost and replaced with more disappointing modern styles of architecture.

One of Ireland's most celebrated museums, the Hunt Museum is based in the historic 18th-century former Custom House. The museum was established to house an internationally important collection of approximately 2,000 works of art and antiquities formed by John and Gertrude Hunt during their lifetimes. On display are the 9th-century Antrim Cross, a sketch by Picasso and a bronze sculpture of a horse, said to be from a design by Leonardo da Vinci.

Victorian and Edwardian architecture
From the 19th century much Victorian and Edwardian architecture was evident in Limerick. Unified terraces, detached or semi detached dwellings were built by the middle classes on roads protruding from the city centre as can be seen today in O' Connell Avenue, South and North Circular Roads, Ennis Road, Shelbourne Road and Mulgrave Street. Typical features of this style of architecture in Limerick include arched or bay windows with brick detailing around doorways and elaborate railings enclosing long front gardens. Features of buildings dating from the Edwardian period also include balconies, porched and timbered gables, and horizontal mullioned windows.

20th century

From the period of Irish Independence right up to the 1960s there was very little development in Limerick. Housing had become a major problem as many of the city's poorer residents lived in overcrowded slums, streets and laneways in the oldest parts of the city. Life in these parts of the city in the early 20th century are perhaps best described in the worldwide best seller Angelas Ashes written by Frank McCourt. During the 1960s Limerick Corporation began to clear the slums and laneways by relocating families to new large council estates on the edge of the city. The estates were built primarily in Moyross, Southill, the Island Field (St. Marys Park) and Ballinacurra Weston. Initially seen to be a success these estates began to experience high levels of disadvantage, unemployment, poverty and crime as was replicated in other parts of Ireland such as Ballymun. Today the estates can be described as Sink estates and are awaiting a massive regeneration project.

The city also expanded during this time with much development outside the city boundary creating new city suburbs. The most notable development is the University of Limerick in the suburb of Castletroy towards the eastern end of the city. UL is the location of the University Concert Hall, a 1000-seat venue on the university campus which is suitable for holding a wide variety of events. The UL arena, which opened in 2002 is Ireland's largest indoor complex. It consists of the National 50m Swimming Pool which is the only water facility in Ireland which has the approval of FINA, the international swimming body, and is the first in the country to be built to Olympic standards. The Arena's Indoor Sports Hall comprises 3,600 square metres laid out with four wood-sprung courts, catering for a variety of sports, a sprint track, an international 400m athletics track, and a 200m three-lane suspended jogging track. The facility also has a state-of-the-art cardiovascular and strength training centre, a weight-training room, team rooms, an aerobics studio and classroom areas. The Arena is often used by the Munster rugby team.  On the southside of the city the Crescent Shopping Centre the largest shopping centre in Ireland outside Dublin was built in the suburb of Dooradoyle. It has a retail space of 100,000m squared with over 90 shops.

By the end of the 20th century and early 21st century Limerick's trend towards suburbanisation continued which has led to many concerns of the development of the city during this time particularly in relation to the amount of out-of-town retail developments which has reduced footfall on city centre streets.

Bridges

As a city situated on a river (the Shannon), and at a crossing point, Limerick's bridges are of vital importance to the region. They connect the northern bank of the river, and County Clare, to the southern bank and County Limerick. Apart from forming part of the Limerick to Galway route, the crossings are important today in connecting Shannon Airport to the city and beyond.

Thomond Bridge

The earliest bridge, Thomond Bridge, was built near a fording point. It was the scene of a failed defending of the city during the Siege of Limerick. At one ends sits the Treaty Stone, which stands as a symbol of the signed treaty. The treaty itself was probably signed in a campaign tent. The current bridge was built in 1836, replacing the earlier bridge which was also alongside King John's Castle. The bridge now forms part of the R445 (formerly N7), carrying traffic on the Northern Relief Road.

Sarsfield Bridge
The second of Limerick's River Shannon crossings is now called Sarsfield Bridge, to commemorate Patrick Sarsfield, the Earl of Lucan, who is renowned in Limerick for his role in the Williamite War and the 1691 siege and Treaty of Limerick in particular. The bridge was opened as Wellesley Bridge on 5 August 1835, following 11 years of construction. It was designed by the Scottish engineer Alexander Nimmo and based on the Pont de Neuilly in Paris. It was a particularly important development for the city as it allowed expansion to the northern shore of the river. The bridge itself consists of five large and elegant elliptical arches with an open balustrade, running from a man-made island, originally called Wellesley Pier but now known as Shannon Island, to the northern shore, and a simple flat, swivel deck with iron lattice railings crossing a canal and road from the island to what was known as Brunswick Street, now Sarsfield Street. The swivel end is no longer functional, although some of its heavy machinery is still intact underneath the roadway. A lock system has replaced the swivel section to allow for the passage of smaller boats. Apart from this, the bridge has remained largely unchanged since it opened and still has its original lamp standards.

Rowing clubhouses sit on Shannon Island at either side of the bridge. The Shannon Rowing Club was founded by Sir Peter Tait in 1866 and has a very elegant clubhouse on the northern side. Limerick Boat Club was founded in 1870 and has a simpler structure on the southern side.

A monument by sculptor James Power located on the bridge just above the Limerick Boat Club building, commemorates the 1916 Rising. An earlier monument on this site was a statue of Viscount Fitzgibbon of Mountshannon House, who was killed in The Charge of the Light Brigade at Balaclava in 1854, flanked by two Russian cannon captured in the Crimean War. This statue was blown up by the Irish Republican Army in 1930. The War of Independence memorial is located at the northern end of the bridge, commemorating two former mayors of Limerick (George Clancy and Michael O'Callaghan), among others, who were killed by the British in 1921. The quays on the northern shore are called Clancy Strand and O'Callaghan Strand in their honour.

Shannon Bridge

The Shannon Bridge is by far the newest River Shannon crossing in Limerick city centre. It was built in the late 1980s, officially opening on 30 May 1988, and connects to a relief road that passes through a bird sanctuary and runs around the north of the city. The bridge is still at times referred to as "The New Bridge", although the Abbey Bridge across the Abbey River is newer. For some time after its construction, the bridge was also termed "The Whistling Bridge" — the fencing on the bridge resonated with the winds coming up the Shannon Estuary, producing a shrill whistling sound. In extreme winds, the sound was quite deafening. Simple grills were added, and the effect was ceased.

Baal's Bridge
This is one of the oldest bridges in the city. The current structure was built in between 1830 and 1831 and is a single-arched hump-back limestone bridge. It replaced an earlier four-arched bridge that formed the only link before the mid-18th century crossing the Abbey river between Englishtown and Irishtown. Early drawings show a row of houses on the bridge before it was replaced. During the construction of the new bridge in 1830 a significant archaeological object was found in the foundations of the old bridge. A brass Square of Freemasonry symbolism was found in the foundations with an inscription dating from 1507. Also inscribed on the square is the text I will strive to live with love and care upon the level, by the square. It is reputed to be one of the earliest Masonic items to be found in the world.

Other bridges and the tunnel
Another bridge at the northern end of King's Island, connects to Corbally on the north of the city. This is a simpler bridge, further up the Shannon. The only other road bridge across the Shannon near the city is the "University Bridge", at the University of Limerick. Opened in 2004 by then Taoiseach Bertie Ahern, this fashionable modern bridge connects the recently commenced north bank campus (includes student villages/accommodation and Health Science building) to the main southern campus, but it does not serve as a public crossing point as there is no north bank entrance from the Clare side.

The university is also home to one of the longest footbridges in Europe – The Living Bridge.

Another bridge is named after Dr. Sylvester O'Halloran.

The Limerick Tunnel opened in July 2010 as part of the Limerick Southern Road. The tunnel forms a fourth river crossing of the Shannon. It is a 675m long, twin-bore road tunnel underneath the River Shannon on the outskirts of the city.

Architecture lost and found

Much of Limerick's architectural heritage has been compromised. The main streets in the city centre were originally fronted by mostly uniform Georgian townhouses. Nowadays significant gaps and oddities may be found, in addition to the dilapidated state of some buildings. The most recent example of a controversial demolition was the Cruises Hotel. This was the oldest hotel in Limerick; Daniel O'Connell himself stayed in it. It was demolished in or around 1990 to allow Cruises Street pedestrian area. Sadly, the site of what was this illustrious building is now home to a McDonald's and Costa Coffee shop on either corner of the street entrance. Other examples of lost architecture include the impressive facade of the old Cannock's Department Store (now Penney's) and its landmark clock tower which was demolished in the 1960s and replaced with a more modern styled building and the facade of Todd's Department Store (now Brown Thomas) which was destroyed by a fire in the late 1950s has also been replaced with a more modern design. Other areas of the city have similar tragic tales.

Since the late 1990s, Ireland has had somewhat tougher development requirements. This has resulted in an increasing number of Georgian and other historical buildings being refurbished rather than demolished. Shining examples include the conversion of a historic bank to a pub, also the conversion of old stone-built warehouses and Georgian townhouses to up-market apartments. These recent refurbishments of Georgian townhouses include cleaned brickwork, replica railings outside sash windows with brass catches, and new replica street railings. Until recently, the tougher development requirements have ironically resulted in tracts of wasteland on King's Island remaining undeveloped due to complicated development work around historical remains of demolished structures. As of 2006 new apartment blocks continue to be built on the Island near the Abbey Bridge.

Modern architecture
Although a lot of developments in Limerick have been concentrated in suburban areas there has been notable modern architectural developments and improvements in the appearance of city centre in recent years. Most developments have been along the banks of the river Shannon and are facing onto the river. The most prominent are the 60m high Riverpoint building and the 200 ft four star Clarion Hotel on Steamboat quay. Other developments include apartments and office blocks along the quays. Other developments in the city centre include the successful redevelopment of Bedford Row, Henry street, Thomas street and Catherine street. In 2007 Thomond Park underwent redevelopment which included the construction of two large stands to accommodate a capacity attendance of 26,500 with 15,100 seated. The stadium has become an icon for Limerick City and in 2009 the design of the stadium won the peoples choice award from the Royal Institute of the Architects of Ireland awards 2009.

Although progress has been made with regards to the architectural quality of buildings in Limerick, dereliction and neglect is continuing to impact parts of the city's most historic stock of buildings. The areas affected include the once thriving streets of Patrick Street, Rutland Street, Ellen Street, Michael Street & Bank Place which enclose the site. The buildings on these streets constitute Limerick's earliest Georgian Developments.

See also

Architecture
Architecture of Ireland
Limerick
History of Limerick
Newtown Pery, Limerick

References

 Shannonside sells itself as Europe's new Riverside City Wednesday, 10 November 2004 The Irish Times

Architecture in the Republic of Ireland
Limerick (city)
 
Architecture in the Republic of Ireland by city